The narrow-striped dasyure or narrow-striped marsupial shrew (Phascolosorex dorsalis) is a species of marsupial in the family Dasyuridae found in West Papua and Papua New Guinea. Its natural habitat is subtropical or tropical dry forests.

Names
It is known as aln in the Kalam language of Papua New Guinea.

References

Dasyuromorphs
Mammals of Papua New Guinea
Mammals of Western New Guinea
Mammals described in 1876
Taxa named by Wilhelm Peters
Taxonomy articles created by Polbot
Marsupials of New Guinea